Hardington Moor is an 8.7 hectare biological Site of Special Scientific Interest between Hardington Mandeville and West Coker in Somerset, notified in 1994.

Hardington Moor National Nature Reserve covers partly calcareous clay-rich soils on sloping ground and comprises three meadows surrounded by established hedges. The meadows are examples of species-rich unimproved neutral grassland, which is now nationally rare. The rare French oat-grass is very abundant on the site and the fields are home to a wide variety of plant species, most notably adder's tongue, corky-fruited water-dropwort and large numbers of green-winged orchid. Invertebrates found at the site include butterflies such as gatekeeper, small tortoiseshell and common blue. Less commonly seen are large skipper, green-veined white and green hairstreak.

References

Sources

 English Nature citation sheet for the site (accessed 9 August 2006)

External links
 English Nature website (SSSI information)

Sites of Special Scientific Interest in Somerset
Sites of Special Scientific Interest notified in 1994
National nature reserves in Somerset